The 1976 Boston Red Sox season was the 76th season in the franchise's Major League Baseball history. The Red Sox finished third in the American League East with a record of 83 wins and 79 losses,  games behind the New York Yankees, who went on to win the AL championship.

Offseason 
 November 17, 1975: Juan Beniquez and Steve Barr were traded by the Red Sox to the Texas Rangers for pitcher Ferguson Jenkins.
 December 12, 1975: Roger Moret was traded by the Red Sox to the Atlanta Braves for Tom House.
 February 15, 1976: Gene Michael was signed as a free agent by the Red Sox.
 March 3, 1976: Dick Drago was traded by the Red Sox to the California Angels for John Balaz, Dick Sharon, and Dave Machemer.

Regular season

Highlights
The Red Sox did not come close to repeating the previous year's success.  An off-season contract dispute with Fred Lynn was a distraction.  In early May, a brawl with the New York Yankees led to a shoulder injury for Bill Lee, one of their best pitchers and a 17-game winner in 1975; Lee would be out until mid-1977, and his loss was keenly felt.

On June 15, Oakland Athletics owner Charlie Finley attempted to sell left fielder Joe Rudi and relief pitcher Rollie Fingers to the Red Sox for $1 million each, and starting pitcher Vida Blue to the New York Yankees for $1.5 million. Three days later, Commissioner of Baseball Bowie Kuhn voided the transactions, citing "the best interests of baseball."

The Red Sox' beloved owner, Tom Yawkey, died of leukemia in July. Manager Darrell Johnson was fired shortly thereafter, and replaced by coach Don Zimmer.  Overall, it was a disappointing season for a talented but underachieving team.

Season standings

Record vs. opponents

Notable transactions 
 April 7, 1976: Diego Seguí was released by the Red Sox.
 May 4, 1976: Gene Michael was released by the Red Sox.
 June 3, 1976: Bernie Carbo was traded by the Red Sox to the Milwaukee Brewers for Bobby Darwin and Tom Murphy.
 June 8, 1976: Wade Boggs was drafted by the Red Sox in the 7th round of the 1976 Major League Baseball Draft. Player signed June 10, 1976.

Opening Day lineup 

Source:

Roster

Statistical leaders 

Source:

Batting 

Source:

Pitching 

Source:

Awards and honors 
 Dwight Evans – Gold Glove Award (OF)
 Luis Tiant – AL Player of the Month (August)

All-Star Game
 Carlton Fisk, reserve C
 Fred Lynn, starting CF
 Luis Tiant, reserve P
 Carl Yastrzemski, reserve OF

Farm system 

 The Pawtucket Red Sox were known as the Rhode Island Red Sox during the 1976 season.

LEAGUE CHAMPIONS: Winston-Salem, Elmira

Source:

Notes

References

External links 
1976 Boston Red Sox team page at Baseball Reference
1976 Boston Red Sox season at baseball-almanac.com

Boston Red Sox seasons
Boston Red Sox
Boston Red Sox
Red Sox